Lead(II) titanate is an inorganic compound with the chemical formula PbTiO3. It is the lead salt of titanic acid. Lead(II) titanate is a yellow powder that is insoluble in water.

At high temperatures, lead titanate adopts a cubic perovskite structure. At 760 K, the material undergoes a second order phase transition to a tetragonal perovskite structure which exhibits ferroelectricity. Lead titanate is one of the end members of the lead zirconate titanate (PZT) system, which is technologically one of the most important ferroelectric and piezoelectric ceramics; PbTiO3 has a high ratio of k33 to kp with a high kt.

Lead titanate occurs in nature as mineral macedonite.

Toxicity
Lead titanate is toxic, like other lead compounds. It irritates skin, mucous membranes and eyes. It may also cause harm to unborn babies and might have effects on fertility.

Solubility in water
The solubility of hydrothermally-synthesized perovskite-phase PbTiO3 in water was experimentally determined at 25 and 80 °C to depend on pH and vary from 4.9x10−4 mol/kg  at pH≈3, to 1.9x10−4 mol/kg at pH≈7.7, to "undetectable" (<3.2x10−7 mol/kg) in the range 10<pH<11.  At still higher pH values, the solubility increased again. The solubility was apparently incongruent and was quantified as the analytical concentration of Pb.

References

Lead(II) compounds
Titanates
Ferroelectric materials
Perovskites